The Butterfly Collection is the second and final full-length album from Californian hardcore punk band, The Nerve Agents.

It was released by Hellcat Records and distributed by Epitaph Records in July, 2001.

Overview 
After the straightforward hardcore punk of the debut EP and the quirky melodies of Days Of The White Owl, this album has more angular riffs and off-the-wall melodies and has slowed down considerably on most tracks.

Songs are still sub-two minute affairs and Eric Ozenne's vocals are the same as they have ever been – manic yell/growls.

The album had its fans – they liked the musical progression and direction it was going – and it had its detractors –  – mostly still citing lack of originality within the Californian hardcore scene.

Fans of the band in general, however, are quick to point out that Eric Ozenne has always been in bands that have played the same sort of music and, in fact, were at the forefront of the scene in the mid-90s with his previous band, Redemption 87 – refer to "See also" below.

Track listing 
 All lyrics written by Eric Ozenne, music written by The Nerve Agents, unless stated
 "The Poisoning" – 2:21
 "Crisis" – 1:18
 "War Against!" – 2:23
 "The Vice of Mrs. Grossly" – 1:55
 "Madam Butterfly" – 1:42
 "Princess Jasmine of Tinseltown" – 2:31
 "What Then?" – 1:53
 "The Legend of H. Gane Ciro" – 2:05
 "But I Might Die Tonight" (Yusuf Islam) – 1:45
 "Metal Pig" – 1:37
 "New Jersey" – 1:34
 "So, Very Avoidable" – 1:11
 "Oh, Ghost of Mine" – 1:42
 "Frost" – 2:27
 "The Cross" – 12:09
 Track 15, a piano instrumental, is actually only approx 3:10 but is followed by silence and then ghostly sounds until the end

Credits 
 Eric Ozenne – vocals
 Tim "Timmy Stardust" Presley – guitar
 Zac "The Butcher" Hunter – guitar
 Dante Sigona – bass, piano
 Andy "Outbreak" Granelli – drums
 Jade Puget and Zane Morris – backing vocals on "But I Might Die Tonight"
 Recorded, mixed and mastered In The Year Of The Snake at Art Of Ears, Hayward, California, USA
 Produced by The Nerve Agents and Andy Ernst
 Engineered by Andy Ernst

See also 
 Redemption 87's album, All Guns Poolside – Eric Ozenne's previous band

References

External links 
 Epitaph / Hellcat Records band page
 Revelation Records' Nerve Agents EP page
 Revelation Records' Days Of The White Owl page

The Nerve Agents albums
2001 albums